Asen was one of several late 17th century states on the Ashantiland Peninsula.

It was located south of Denkyira and thus between Denkyira and the coast.  This led to wars between the two in the 1690s caused by Denkyira wanting to maintain the trade from its realm to the coast.

Sources
 McCaskie, T. C. "Denkyira in the Making of Asante" in The Journal of African History vol. 48 (2007), no. 1, p. 1.

Former countries in Africa
Geography of Ghana